Montescardia tessulatella is a moth of the family Tineidae. It is found in most of Europe, except the Iberian Peninsula, the Benelux, Britain, Ireland, the Balkan and Greece.

The wingspan is 20–28 mm.

External links
 Lepiforum

Scardiinae
Moths of Europe
Moths described in 1846